Boris Levitan (7 June 1914 – 4 April 2004) was a mathematician known in particular for his work on almost periodic functions, and Sturm–Liouville operators, especially, on inverse scattering.

Life

Boris Levitan was born in Berdyansk (south-eastern Ukraine), and grew up in Kharkiv. He graduated from Kharkov University in 1936; in 1938, he submitted his PhD thesis "Some Generalization of Almost Periodic Function" under the supervision of Naum Akhiezer. Then he defended the habilitation thesis "Theory of Generalized Translation Operators".

He was drafted into the army at the beginning of World War II in 1941, and served until 1944. From 1944 to 1961, he worked at the Dzerzhinsky Military Academy, and from 1961 until about 1992 at Moscow University. In 1992, Levitan emigrated to the United States. During the last years of his life, he worked in the University of Minnesota.

References

Mathematical analysts
National University of Kharkiv alumni
1914 births
2004 deaths
People from Berdiansk
Ukrainian mathematicians
Ukrainian Jews
Soviet mathematicians
Russian emigrants to the United States